The men's 800 metres at the 2010 IAAF World Indoor Championships was held at the ASPIRE Dome on 12, 13 and 14 March.

Medalists

Records

Qualification standards

Schedule

Results

Heats
Qualification: First 2 in each heat (Q) and the next 2 fastest (q) advance to the semifinals.

Semifinals
Qualification: First 3 in each heat (Q) advance to the final.

Final

References

Heats Results
Semifinals Results
Final Result

800 metres
800 metres at the World Athletics Indoor Championships